Anne Wentworth may refer to:

Anne Blunt, 15th Baroness Wentworth
Anne Wentworth, Countess of Strafford
Anne Byron, 11th Baroness Wentworth
Anne Wentworth (prophetess), 17th c
Anne Wentworth (16th-century visionary)

See also
Anne Elliot